Happy Daze, an album by The Battlefield Band, was released in 2001 on the Temple Records label.

Track listing
 "The Devil's Courtship / An Dro" – 3:47
 "Medium Man / Floating Candles / Nighean Cailleach nan Cearc" – 3:58
 "The Banks of Red Roses" – 5:17
 "Tiny Wee Vin / The Road to the Aisle" – 4:14
 "The Riccarton Tollman's Daughter" – 4:15
 "Shepherd Lad" – 3:53
 "The Merry Macs / Dr. Iain Mac Aonghais" – 4:24
 "Happy Days" – 4:55
 "Whaur Will We Gang? / March of the Ceili Man" – 3:21
 "A Mile Down the Road /Johnny's Jig / Boys of the Puddle" – 4:30
 "Start It All over Again" – 5:05
 "Wee Michael's March / Oot B'est da Vong" – 4:03
 "Love No More" – 3:38
 "Blue Bonnets over the Border / Khazi" – 3:52
 "The 24th Guards Brigade at Anzio / The Melbourne Sleeper / MacRae's of Linn" – 3:51

Personnel

Battlefield Band
 Alan Reid (keyboards, vocals)
 Karine Polwart (lead vocals, guitar) 
 John McCusker (fiddle, whistle, cittern) 
 Mike Katz (Highland pipes, small pipes, various whistles...)

References

Battlefield Band albums
2001 albums